Peter George Olenchuk (July 14, 1922 – October 6, 2000) was a major general in the United States Army.

Biography
Originally a native of Bayonne, New Jersey, Olenchuk graduated from Lebanon Valley College before obtaining a M.A. in Bacteriology from the University of Wisconsin-Madison and a M.B.A. in Business Administration from George Washington University. He married Ruth Clement and have three children. On 9 August 1970 his daughter Mary C. Olenchuk, born November 18, 1956, disappeared from Ogunquit, Maine. On 22 August 1970 her strangled body was discovered hidden under a pile of hay
 in an abandoned barn 9 miles away in Kennebunk, Maine. It remains one of Maine's oldest unsolved murders. Olenchuk died on October 6, 2000, in Ogunquit, Maine. He is buried at Arlington National Cemetery.

Career
Olenchuk enlisted in the Army Corps of Engineers in 1943 and served in North Africa and the Far East in World War II.  He became a commissioned officer in 1945 and his assignments included two tours of duty in the Vietnam War.  In 1963 Olenchuk headed a team to observe and evaluate "Operation Ranch Hand" the name given to the defoliation and crop destruction programs in Vietnam.  The resulting Olenchuk Report pronounced these early programs to be both militarily and technologically effective and was instrumental in obtaining approval for the continuation and expansion of what has come to be known as The Agent Orange Program.  From 1966 - 1968 he assumed command of Fort Detrick, at that time the U.S. center for biological warfare, in Frederick, Maryland.  In the late 1960s he oversaw the controversial Operation CHASE. In 1973 he became Director of Material Acquisition of the Army. Later he became Assistant Deputy Chief of Staff for Research, Development, and Acquisition. He retired in 1975.  He was posthumously inducted into the Chemical Corps Regimental Association Hall of Fame in 2001.

Awards he received include the Army Distinguished Service Medal, the Legion of Merit, the Air Medal, and the Joint Service Commendation Medal.

References

People from Bayonne, New Jersey
People from Ogunquit, Maine
United States Army generals
Recipients of the Distinguished Service Medal (US Army)
Recipients of the Legion of Merit
Recipients of the Air Medal
Lebanon Valley College alumni
University of Wisconsin School of Medicine and Public Health alumni
George Washington University School of Business alumni
Burials at Arlington National Cemetery
2000 deaths
1922 births
United States Army personnel of World War II